Glen David Metropolit (born June 25, 1974) is a Canadian former professional ice hockey centre who most notably played over 400 games in the National Hockey League (NHL)

Playing career

Early years
A native of Toronto, Ontario, Metropolit was never drafted by an OHL or NHL team, yet managed a 10-year NHL career and 407 games played.  After a GTHL career mostly in AA hockey, Metropolit played two seasons for the Richmond Hill Riots Jr.B. hockey club (OHA) before heading west to play for the Vernon Vipers of the BCHL.

After graduating Tier II Jr.A. hockey, Metropolit started out playing for the Nashville Knights in the ECHL in the 1995–96 season. He also played for the Pensacola Ice Pilots and Grand Rapids Griffins before making his NHL debut in 1999–2000 for the Washington Capitals. For the next three seasons, he alternated between the Capitals and the AHL's Portland Pirates, and also played two games for Tampa Bay in 2001–02.

Overseas
In 2003 Metropolit crossed the Atlantic to play in Helsinki with Jokerit for the 2003–04 season. In a brilliant first season, he scored the most points on the team, 50, with 15 goals and 35 assists, the fifth-highest total during the regular season. He scored six goals during seven playoff games that year, but Jokerit were eliminated in the quarterfinals.

In the 2004–05 season Metropolit and Marko Jantunen were the team's best goal scorers during the regular season, both scoring 16 goals, and Metropolit scored the most points on the team with 31 assists, totalling 47 points; the eighth-highest total in the league. In the playoffs, he scored five goals and six assists, including a 3-on-5 shorthanded goal against Ilves's Vesa Toskala in the quarterfinals. The team went on to win the silver medal.

Metropolit became a very popular player with the Jokerit fans, who had a number of chants dedicated to him. He is remembered as a gifted playmaker, with one of his favorite spots, on the outside of the left faceoff circle in the offensive zone, being called "Metro's office" by TV commentators and fans, in honour of Wayne Gretzky's "office" behind the goal. He and Marko Jantunen formed a memorable duo on the penalty kill, scoring several short-handed goals. His player number in Jokerit was #50.

After two years with Jokerit, Metropolit moved to Switzerland where he won the Nationalliga A championship with HC Lugano. He also led the league in scoring during the regular season, which is where his infamous nickname "The Underlying Theme" was born by announcer Darren Bavister.

Atlanta/St. Louis/Boston
In 2006, Metropolit returned to North America when he was signed by the Atlanta Thrashers.  After limited playing time with Atlanta, Metropolit was dealt near the trade deadline to the St. Louis Blues, along with a package of draft picks, in exchange for Blues centre/wing Keith Tkachuk.

Metropolit became a free agent at the end of the season before being invited by the Boston Bruins to the team training camp.  Just prior to the 2007–08 season on October 3, 2007, he signed a one-year contract with the Bruins. Having established a role within the checking lines and on the power play, he excelled with the Bruins, posting a career high 33 points in 82 games.

Philadelphia/Montreal
Metropolit signed a two-year contract with the Philadelphia Flyers as a free agent on July 1, 2008. He was placed on waivers and picked up near the trading deadline on February 27, 2009, by the Montreal Canadiens in need of a veteran centreman. He trained with the Philadelphia Flyers on the morning of February 27 before being claimed in the afternoon.  Later that night, he played against his former team with the Montreal Canadiens. He scored his first goal with Montreal on March 10 against Dwayne Roloson from the Edmonton Oilers.

In the 2009–10 season on March 30, 2010, it was announced that Metropolit would miss the final 6 games of the season with a torn shoulder muscle, after enjoying a career high 16 goals with Montreal. An extremely speedy recovery allowed him to be back on the ice on April 19, 2010, for the third game of the playoff series against the Washington Capitals.

After the NHL
On August 2, 2010, Metropolit left the NHL as a free agent and signed a two-year contract to return the Swiss NLA with EV Zug. Upon completion of his contract with Zug, Metropolit moved to return to sign a two-year contract with HC Lugano. In the 2013–14 season, on February 5, 2014, Metropolit was traded to SC Bern in exchange for Mikko Lehtonen. After four years in Switzerland, he moved to Germany, spending a two-year stint at Adler Mannheim, capturing the German national championship in 2015.

On October 20, 2016, he signed with Italian club HC Bolzano, a member of the Austrian top-flight EBEL. He parted ways with the club on February 6, 2017 due to family reasons.

Career statistics

Regular season and playoffs

International

References

External links
 

1974 births
Living people
Adler Mannheim players
Anaheim Bullfrogs players
Atlanta Knights players
Atlanta Thrashers players
Bolzano HC players
Boston Bruins players
Canadian ice hockey centres
EV Zug players
Grand Rapids Griffins (IHL) players
HC Lugano players
Ice hockey people from Toronto
Jokerit players
Long Island Jawz players
Montreal Canadiens players
Nashville Knights players
New Jersey Rockin' Rollers players
Pensacola Ice Pilots players
Philadelphia Flyers players
Portland Pirates players
Quebec Rafales players
SC Bern players
St. Louis Blues players
Tampa Bay Lightning players
Undrafted National Hockey League players
Vernon Lakers players
Washington Capitals players
Canadian expatriate ice hockey players in Finland
Canadian expatriate ice hockey players in Germany
Canadian expatriate ice hockey players in Switzerland